Jean de Vienne (1341 – 25 September 1396) was a French knight, general and Admiral of France during the Hundred Years' War.

Early life
Jean de Vienne was born at Dole, in what is now Franche-Comté. As a nobleman, he started his military career at the age of 19, and was made a knight at 21. At 1366-1367 he took a part of a Savoyard crusade lead by Amadeus VI of Savoy against Bulgaria.

Career

By the age of 24, de Vienne was made Captain-General for the Franche-Comté. In 1373, Charles V made him Amiral de France. Working with determination, de Vienne reorganised the navy, started an important programme of construction, created an effective coast guard, navigation police, organised watches along the coasts, and attributed licences for building and selling of ships.

Jean de Vienne was one of the first to understand that only by naval operations could serious harm be done to England. To this end he petitioned for strong support from the French monarchy and conducted several expeditions to Wight and the southern ports of England.

Between 1381 and 1385, de Vienne fought against the Flemish, notably during the Battle of Roosebeke. In pursuit of his dream of threatening the English at home, in 1385 he used a 180 ship fleet to land an army in Scotland with the intent of invading England, but the force had to withdraw. After Charles VI succeeded his father Charles V to the Throne of France, the navy was allowed to decay, since Charles VI did not share his father's concern for naval affairs. Disappointed, de Vienne participated in the Barbary Crusade and joined in the crusade of King Sigismund of Hungary against the Turks. He was killed during the battle of Nicopolis, in Bulgaria.

Legacy
Several ships of the French Navy were named after Jean de Vienne, most notable of which include:
 The cruiser , completed 1937, scuttled at Toulon in November 1942
 the F70 type frigate , completed 1984, decommissioned in 2019.

References

1341 births
1396 deaths
People from Dole, Jura
Admirals of France
French generals
Christians of the Barbary Crusade
Christians of the Battle of Nicopolis
People of the Hundred Years' War
French military personnel killed in action